Preecha Chaokla is a Thai former footballer. He won Thai Premier League title in 2006 with Bangkok University.

Honours
Thailand U-19
 AFF U-20 Youth Championship: 2002
Thailand U-23
 SEA Games Gold Medal: 2005

International goals

Under-19

External links
Profile at Thaipremierleague.co.th

1981 births
Living people
Preecha Chaokla
Association football forwards
Preecha Chaokla
Nam Định F.C. players
Preecha Chaokla